Bălilești is a commune in Argeș County, Muntenia, Romania. It is composed of seven villages: Băjești, Bălilești, Golești, Poienița, Priboaia, Ulita, and Valea Mare-Bratia.

It is traversed by the river Bratia.

References

Communes in Argeș County
Localities in Muntenia